Peter Páleš (born June 7, 1967) is a Czechoslovak-Slovak sprint canoer who competed from the late 1980s to the mid-2000s (decade). He won a bronze medal in the C-4 500 m event at the 1994 ICF Canoe Sprint World Championships in Mexico City.

Páleš also competed in four Summer Olympics, earning his best finish of seventh twice (1988: C-1 1000 m for Czechoslovakia, 1996: C-2 1000 m for Slovakia).

References

Sports-reference.com profile

1967 births
Canoeists at the 1988 Summer Olympics
Canoeists at the 1996 Summer Olympics
Canoeists at the 2000 Summer Olympics
Canoeists at the 2004 Summer Olympics
Czechoslovak male canoeists
Living people
Olympic canoeists of Czechoslovakia
Olympic canoeists of Slovakia
Slovak male canoeists
ICF Canoe Sprint World Championships medalists in Canadian